Charles William George Hadcock is a British sculptor. (born 1965 in Derby, England) known for his monumental sculptures that incorporate elements of geology, engineering, and mathematics, Hadcock's work also draws inspiration from music, philosophy, and poetry. He is a Deputy Lieutenant of Derbyshire.

Charles Hadcock sculptures can be found in a variety of public and private collections around the world. His works are often large in scale and are made from a variety of materials, including steel, stone, and bronze. Some of his notable sculptures include "Echoes," a large-scale sculpture at the Royal Opera House in London, and "The Sentinel," a sculpture located at the National Memorial Arboretum in Staffordshire, England. Two sculptures, "Helisphere" and "Torsion II", are exhibited in Canary Wharf Art Trail, London.

Education
Charles Hadcock studied at Ampleforth College 1979–1983, Derby College of Art & Technology 1983–1984, Cheltenham College of Art 1984–1987, Royal College of Art 1987–1989

Career

Aspects of the natural world, geology and engineering lie in combination within Charles Hadcock's work openly, or as hidden jewels.  Finding that the mathematical formulas for shapes observed within the natural world are often the source for solving engineering design problems, Hadcock has incorporated these ideas both at first and at second hand into components for his sculptures.  Thus, his direct observation of rocks becomes a source for the surface of his sculptures whilst mathematics comes to the fore in planning how a sculpture may be achieved with multiple castings of a single form.  Hadcock's works are imbued with a visual vitality so that the sculptures remain free, dynamic, unrestrained and immediate.

Hadcock prefers to work on his own sculpture rather than rely on production facilities so that the eye and hand of the artist is apparent in every work.  His belief is that his knowledge, skill and techniques are constantly evolving, informing each piece he makes.

Investigating Multiples, a solo exhibition in London at Reed's Wharf Gallery in 1996 followed the siting of Caesura IV at Sculpture at Goodwood.  His first monumental public commission in 1997 Passacaglia came after a national competition for a permanent work to be installed on Brighton Beach.  Controversial initially, Passacaglia is now an iconic feature of the Brighton beachfront.

A 1999 exhibition of Hadcock's drawings and maquettes 'If in doubt, ask' at London's Imperial College was part of a drive by the university to encourage engineering students to learn about the Arts.  "There is 1 in all of us" was a collaboration with soundscape engineers at the Gardner Arts Centre, University of Sussex, whilst the Peter Scott Gallery at Lancaster University had to find additional exhibition space outside the gallery in 2006.

Hadcock was included in the 1999 exhibition of British sculptors 'Shape of the Century' at Salisbury Cathedral and Canary Wharf which was followed by inclusion in Bronze: Contemporary British Sculpture a group show to celebrate the millennium and the tradition of siting Bronze sculpture in London parks.  Hadcock's monumental bronze Caesura VI was installed and remains in situ in Holland Park, London.

At this time Hadcock moved his studio from London to Lancashire when the scale of his work required additional space and facilities to enable the production of the monumental works being frequently commissioned for locations around the country.

Hadcock has on occasion produced commissions to brief, such as a monument to commemorate film director James Whale, erected in 2001 on the grounds of a multiplex cinema in Whale's hometown of Dudley, and the installation of a sculptural gate and railings around a development in Central London.

Hadcock's exhibiting programme continued with a solo show at Canary Wharf in 2003, followed by a second larger solo show in 2011. He exhibited in Sotheby's Beyond Limits Exhibition at Chatsworth House in 2011 and 2016 and in independent solo exhibitions in London at 60 Threadneedle Street 2015 in the award-winning Eric Parry Architects designed foyer, and in a pop-up gallery near Green Park in 2016 with solo exhibition Fusion.

Business
Charles Hadcock is a director of Roach Bridge Tissues, a Lancashire-based manufacturing company specialising in bespoke printing and conversion of tissue wrapping paper.

Between 2008 and 2012 he managed the development and installation of a hydro-electric power generating station at Roach Bridge Mill, Lancashire, where he is also the development director for an ongoing project to create a new business village on the historic mill site.

Hadcock is Chairman of Creative Lancashire a public and private sector initiative to encourage and support all the creative industries in Lancashire.

Past projects include the development and management of The Watermark Studios a mix of office and studio space in Preston (2001–2009).

Awards
Charles Hadcock is a holder of The Queen's Award for Enterprise Promotion, which he was the recipient of on 21 April 2007.

Hadcock was commissioned a Deputy Lieutenant for Lancashire in 2014.

References

External links
 Official Charles Hadcock website
 Website of Creative Lancashire

1965 births
Living people
People from Derby
British sculptors
British businesspeople
Deputy Lieutenants of Lancashire
Queen's Award for Enterprise Promotion (2007)
People educated at Ampleforth College
Alumni of the University of Gloucestershire
Alumni of the Royal College of Art
20th-century British sculptors
21st-century British sculptors